Cara Black and Elena Likhovtseva were the defending champions, but were forced to withdraw in their semifinals match.

Daniela Hantuchová and Arantxa Sánchez Vicario won the title by defeating Tathiana Garbin and Janette Husárová 6–3, 1–6, 7–5 in the final.

Seeds

Draw

Draw

References

External links
 Official results archive (WTA)

Pilot Pen Tennis
Connecticut Open (tennis)
2002 Pilot Pen Tennis